Eugeniusz Stanislaw Lewacki (born 24 January 1926) is a Polish former ice hockey center and Olympian. Lewacki played for Poland at the 1948 Winter Olympics and 1952 Winter Olympics. He also played for KTH Krynica and Gwardia Bydgoszcz in the Polish Hockey League.

References

1926 births
Ice hockey players at the 1948 Winter Olympics
Ice hockey players at the 1952 Winter Olympics
KTH Krynica players
Living people
Olympic ice hockey players of Poland
Polish ice hockey centres
Sportspeople from Kraków